The Weekly Rehearsal or The Rehearsal (1731–1735) was a literary newspaper published in Boston, Massachusetts, in the 1730s.  Jeremiah Gridley served as editor and publisher (1731-1733); other publishers/printers included John Draper and Thomas Fleet. In 1735 it was continued by Thomas Fleet's Boston Evening Post.

See also
 The Boston Evening-Post, successor to The Rehearsal

Image gallery

References

Further reading

 Isaiah Thomas, Benjamin Franklin Thomas. The history of printing in America: with a biography of printers, and an account of newspapers, Volume 1. J. Munsell, printer, 1874.
 Albert Matthews. Check-list of Boston newspapers, 1704-1780. Colonial Society of Massachusetts, 1907.
 John K. Reeves. Jeremy Gridley, Editor. New England Quarterly, Vol. 17, No. 2 (Jun., 1944), pp. 265-281.
 Charles E. Clark. Boston and the Nurturing of Newspapers: Dimensions of the Cradle, 1690-1741. New England Quarterly, Vol. 64, No. 2 (Jun., 1991).

Publications established in 1731
Publications disestablished in 1735
Cultural history of Boston
18th century in Boston
Newspapers published in Boston
Defunct newspapers published in Massachusetts
1731 in Massachusetts
1731 establishments in Massachusetts